Erik Hoel is an American neuroscientist, neurophilosopher and fiction writer. His main areas of research are the study and philosophy of consciousness, cognition, biological function of dreams, and mathematical theories of emergence. He is noted for using information theory and causal analysis to develop mathematical models to explore and understand the basis of consciousness and dreams. Hoel holds a PhD degree in neuroscience from the University of Wisconsin–Madison, and in 2018 was recipient of Forbes 30 Under 30 – Science. He is currently working as a research assistant professor at Tufts University.

Research career 
Hoel was previously a postdoctoral researcher in the lab of Rafael Yuste at Columbia University, and a visiting fellow at the Institute for Advanced Study in Princeton. He is known for the idea of "causal emergence", a formal theory about how macroscales of systems can have stronger causal relationships than their underlying microscale. He has also developed the overfitted brain hypothesis, on how dreams evolved as a way to prevent overfitting during learning.

Writing career 
Erik also writes essays that have been published in The Atlantic, The Baffler, among others. Andre Dubus III tutored Hoel on writing when he was 13.

Hoel writes on substack, his blog is called The Intrinsic Perspective.

The Revelations 
Erik also authored a literary fiction novel The Revelations, a mystery set at New York University concerning a fictional scholarship program that brings together eight young consciousness researchers, one of whom is murdered. Publishers Weekly called it "a dizzying, impressive debut".

Personal life 
Erik's mother is Sue Little, who operates Jabberwocky Books bookstore for more than 50 years. He is married to Julia Buntaine Hoel, a fellow neuroscientist, artist and the founder of the SciArt Initiative. They have a son, Roman, born in 2021.

Bibliography 
Fiction
 
Selected publications

See also 

 David Eagleman
Eleanor Maguire
 Susan Ackerman

References

External links 
 Hoel's blog on substack
 Profile at Tufts

American cognitive scientists
American neuroscientists
Living people
Year of birth missing (living people)
Tufts University faculty